The 2006 Survivor Series was the 20th annual Survivor Series professional wrestling pay-per-view (PPV) event produced by World Wrestling Entertainment (WWE). It was held for wrestlers from the promotion's Raw, SmackDown!, and ECW brand divisions. The event took place on November 26, 2006, at the Wachovia Center in Philadelphia, Pennsylvania. It was the first Survivor Series to include the ECW brand.

The main match on the SmackDown! brand was King Booker versus Batista for the World Heavyweight Championship, which Batista won by pinfall after hitting Booker with the World Heavyweight Championship belt. The main match on the Raw and ECW brands was Team Cena (John Cena, Bobby Lashley, Kane, Sabu and Rob Van Dam) versus Team Big Show (Big Show, Test, Finlay, Montel Vontavious Porter and Umaga) in a 5 on 5 Survivor Series match. Team Cena won the match after Cena pinned Big Show last. The primary match on the SmackDown! brand was Chris Benoit versus Chavo Guerrero Jr. for the WWE United States Championship, which Benoit won after forcing Guerrero to submit to the Sharpshooter.
Mickie James defeated Lita with the Mickie DDT in Lita's retirement match to win the WWE Women's Championship. The main match on the card was Team DX (Triple H, Shawn Michaels, Jeff Hardy, CM Punk and Matt Hardy) versus Team Rated-RKO (Edge, Randy Orton, Johnny Nitro, Mike Knox and Gregory Helms) in a 5 on 5 Survivor Series match. Team DX won the match after Triple H pinned Orton following a Pedigree. This marked the first time since the brand extension was created that wrestlers from different brands wrestled on the same Survivor Series team.

Production

Background
Survivor Series is an annual gimmick pay-per-view (PPV), produced every November by World Wrestling Entertainment (WWE) since 1987. In what has become the second longest running pay-per-view event in history (behind WWE's WrestleMania), it is one of the promotion's original four pay-per-views, along with WrestleMania, Royal Rumble, and SummerSlam, referred to as the "Big Four". The event is traditionally characterized by having Survivor Series matches, which are tag team elimination matches that typically pits teams of four or five wrestlers against each other. The 2006 event was the 20th event in the Survivor Series chronology and featured wrestlers from the Raw, SmackDown!, and ECW brands. It was the first Survivor Series to include ECW, a relaunch of the former Extreme Championship Wrestling promotion that became a WWE brand in May, subsequently also being the first to feature the ECW World Championship (though the championship was not defended as the champion was involved in a Survivor Series match). The event was scheduled to be held on November 26, 2006, at the Wachovia Center in Philadelphia, Pennsylvania.

Storylines
The event consisted of seven professional wrestling matches with outcomes predetermined by WWE script writers. The wrestlers portrayed their characters in planned storylines that took place before, during, and after the event. All wrestlers were from either one of the WWE's brands – Raw, SmackDown!, and ECW – while the storylines played out on their weekly television shows, Raw, SmackDown!, and ECW.

The main feud heading into Survivor Series was between John Cena and Umaga. Umaga was Cena's latest challenge after Cena finished off the feud between King Booker and The Big Show at Cyber Sunday. On the November 13 episode of Raw, Cena and Umaga finally fought in a singles match, but it was interrupted by the ECW World Champion The Big Show forcing it to a no-contest.

The primary feud on SmackDown! was between World Heavyweight Champion King Booker and Batista. Batista relinquished the title in Philadelphia at the Wachovia Center on the January 13 episode of SmackDown!, the same exact location of Survivor Series due to a triceps injury. King Booker had already faced Batista and retained the World Heavyweight Championship at two pay-per-views (SummerSlam and No Mercy - the latter in a fatal four-way) since his return on the July 7 episode of SmackDown!. This time, Theodore Long announced that the match at Survivor Series would be Batista's last chance to win the World Heavyweight Championship. Another feud was between The Undertaker and Mr. Kennedy. Kennedy beat Undertaker at No Mercy by disqualification. On the November 10 edition of SmackDown!, Kennedy challenged Undertaker once more bragging that he beat four former World Champions. The match was made into a First blood match.

The ECW brand was building up their "Extreme Elimination Chamber" match. The contestants that were named to face the ECW World Champion The Big Show were: Rob Van Dam, Sabu, CM Punk, and Test. The final contestant was revealed on the November 21 edition of ECW. It was Bobby Lashley, and he attacked Big Show during the in-ring segment.

Event

Prior to the event, Lauren Hart sang the United States national anthem. A non-televised match between Carlito and Charlie Haas took place, which Carlito won after a Backstabber.

The first match was a four-on-four Survivor Series match between Team Spirit Squad (Kenny, Johnny, Nicky and Mikey), with Mitch managing the team and Team WWE Legends (Ric Flair, Sgt. Slaughter, Dusty Rhodes, and Ron Simmons), with Arn Anderson managing the team. Simmons was eliminated after being counted out, leading to the referee ejecting Anderson and Mitch. Nicky eliminated Slaughter after a Spinning Heel Kick by Johnny. Rhodes eliminated Nicky after a Bionic Elbow. Kenny eliminated Rhodes with a roll-up while holding Rhodes' jeans. Flair eliminated Mikey, using the ropes for leverage while pinning Mikey. Flair also eliminated Kenny with an inside cradle. Flair also eliminated Johnny after submitting to the Figure Four Leglock, leaving Flair as the sole survivor. After the match, The Spirit Squad attacked Flair.

In the second match, Chris Benoit faced Chavo Guerrero for the United States Championship. During the match, Chavo executed a Frog Splash on Benoit for a near-fall. Benoit accidentally knocked Vickie Guerrero off the apron when Chavo countered Benoit's attempt to apply the Sharpshooter. Benoit forced Chavo to submit to the Crippler Crossface to retain the title.

Next, Lita defended the Women's Championship against Mickie James in Lita's "last" match, during which she had to endure "she's a crack whore" chants from the crowd. James performed the Tornado DDT to win back the title. After the match, Cryme Tyme came out and sold Lita's personal belongings to the audience which they stole in an earlier backstage segment, much to her shock and horror.

The next match was a traditional Survivor Series match between Team DX (Triple H, Shawn Michaels, Jeff Hardy, Matt Hardy, and CM Punk) versus Team Rated-RKO (Edge, Randy Orton, Johnny Nitro, Gregory Helms, and Mike Knox). Knox was eliminated by Michaels after Sweet Chin Music while Knox was distracted by his then-girlfriend, Kelly Kelly. Nitro was eliminated by Punk after submitting to the Anaconda Vice. Helms was then eliminated by Matt after a Twist of Fate by Matt and a Swanton Bomb from Jeff Hardy. Edge was eliminated by Michaels after Sweet Chin Music. Orton was eliminated by Triple H after Sweet Chin Music by Michaels and a Pedigree, meaning Team DX won the match with no members eliminated.

The fifth match was a First blood match between Mr. Kennedy and The Undertaker. During the match, Kennedy started to cough blood but Montel Vontavious Porter (MVP) provided Kennedy with a towel and cleaned the blood. Referee Charles Robinson did not notice that Kennedy was bleeding so the match continued. The match ended when MVP hit The Undertaker with a chair, causing him to bleed. After the match, The Undertaker hit Kennedy with a chair and performed a Tombstone piledriver on him.

The next match was the traditional Survivor Series match between Team Cena (John Cena, Rob Van Dam, Sabu, Kane, and Bobby Lashley) and Team Big Show (The Big Show, Test, Umaga, Finlay, and Montel Vontavious Porter (MVP)). Umaga was eliminated after being disqualified for hitting Van Dam with a television monitor. Van Dam eliminated MVP after a chokeslam by Kane and a Five Star Frog Splash. Test eliminated Van Dam after a Running Big Boot. Sabu eliminated Test after a Springboard Tornado DDT. Big Show eliminated Sabu with a chokeslam. Kane was eliminated when Finlay hit Kane with a shillelagh and Big Show performed a Chokeslam on Kane. Lashley speared Finlay to eliminate him. Cena eliminated Big Show after a Spear by Lashley and an FU, leaving Cena and Lashley as the sole survivors.

The main event was between King Booker and Batista for the World Heavyweight Championship. The stipulation was that if Batista lost, he would never have another chance at the title as long as Booker was champion. Theodore Long announced before the match, if Booker had been disqualified or counted out, he would lose the championship. Batista executed a Spinebuster on Booker for a near-fall. Booker executed a Book End on Batista for a near-fall. Batista executed a Batista Bomb on Booker but Booker touched the bottom rope, voiding the pinfall. Batista almost executed a Batista Bomb on King Booker's wife, Queen Sharmell, but threw her out of the ring instead. Whilst the referee was tending to Sharmell, Booker attempted to hit Batista with the title belt but Batista countered and hit Booker with the belt. Batista pinned Booker to win the title.

Aftermath
The following night on Raw, Triple H, Shawn Michaels, and Ric Flair defeated all five members of the Spirit Squad. They were sick and tired of the Spirit Squad, so in a backstage segment, DX locked the Spirit Squad in a travel case and sent them to Ohio Valley Wrestling in Louisville, Kentucky via delivery man. That was the end of the Spirit Squad faction. As for DX's teammates at Survivor Series, The Hardys were challenged by the newly reunited team of MNM (Johnny Nitro and Joey Mercury). Eventually, they had a tag team match at December to Dismember.

Victoria earned a shot at the Women's Championship by defeating Melina, Torrie Wilson, Maria, and Candice Michelle in a battle royal. She eventually lost to the Women's Champion Mickie James at New Year's Revolution.

WWE Champion John Cena was challenged by the undefeated Umaga the next night on Raw. Cena accepted the challenge and they had the championship match at the next Raw pay-per-view, New Year's Revolution. Cena ended Umaga's winning streak to retain the championship.

On the following episode of SmackDown!, General Manager Theodore Long announced Kane versus Montel Vontavious Porter in an Inferno match and The Undertaker versus Mr. Kennedy in a Last Ride match at Armageddon. This led to the reunification of The Brothers of Destruction versus Kennedy and MVP on the December 15 episode of SmackDown!.

The ECW main feud was between Big Show and Bobby Lashley who signed a contract to be in the Extreme Elimination Chamber match on the November 14 of ECW. At December to Dismember, Lashley became the new ECW World Champion by winning the Extreme Elimination Chamber match.

After defeating King Booker at Survivor Series, Batista would go on to hold the World Heavyweight Championship for four months, defending it against Mr. Kennedy at the 2007 Royal Rumble. Batista would then finally lose the championship to The Undertaker, the winner of the 2007 Royal Rumble, at WrestleMania 23.

Results

Survivor Series elimination matches

References

External links
Official Survivor Series 2006 website

2006 in Pennsylvania
Events in Philadelphia
2006
Professional wrestling in Philadelphia
2006 WWE pay-per-view events
November 2006 events in the United States